This article lists all rugby league footballers who have played first-grade for the Brisbane Broncos in the National Rugby League.

Notes:
 Debut:
 Players are listed in the order of their debut game with the club.
 Players that debuted in the same game are added by jersey number.
 Appearances: Brisbane Broncos games only, not a total of their career games. For example, Brent Tate has played a career total of 229 first-grade games but of those, 114 were at the Broncos.
 Previous Club: refers to the previous first-grade rugby league club (NRL, QRL, or Super League) the player played at and does not refer to any junior club, rugby union club or a rugby league club he was signed to but never played at.

List of players
 The statistics in this table are correct as of round 2 of the 2023 NRL season.

Women's
Table last updated: 23 October 2022.

See also

Sources
"The Encyclopedia of Rugby League Players: Every Brisbane Broncos Player Ever" By Alan Whiticker & Glen Hudson. Published by  Bas Publishing, 2005.
"Rugby League Project" website - http://www.rugbyleagueproject.org/

Lists of Australian rugby league players
 
Brisbane sport-related lists
National Rugby League lists